Kay Thi Win (born ) was a Burmese weightlifter, competing in the 48 kg category and representing Myanmar at international competitions. 

She competed at world championships, most recently at the 1999 World Weightlifting Championships. She also competed at the Summer Olympics in 2000 in Sydney, Australia in the 48 kg category and narrowly missed out the podium placing fourth, with this performance she still remains as the best Burmese athlete in the entire history of the olympics.

Major results

References

External links
 
Win Kay Thi at Sports Reference
https://abcnews.go.com/Sports/story?id=100496
https://groups.google.com/forum/#!topic/soc.culture.burma/tDfyXP7_VAg
http://www.burmanet.org/news/2004/08/10/xinhua-general-news-service-myanmar-to-compete-in-weightlifting-archery-in-athens-olympics/

1975 births
Living people
Burmese female weightlifters
Place of birth missing (living people)
Weightlifters at the 1998 Asian Games
Asian Games medalists in weightlifting
Asian Games silver medalists for Myanmar
Weightlifters at the 2002 Asian Games
Weightlifters at the 2000 Summer Olympics
Olympic weightlifters of Myanmar
Medalists at the 1998 Asian Games
Medalists at the 2002 Asian Games
Southeast Asian Games gold medalists for Myanmar
Southeast Asian Games medalists in weightlifting
Competitors at the 2003 Southeast Asian Games